PandaDoc is an American software company that provides SaaS software. The platform provides sales processes software. PandaDoc is based in San Francisco, California with main offices in St. Petersburg, Florida. PandaDoc is document automation software as a service with built-in electronic signatures, workflow management, a document builder, and CPQ functionality. Some Belarusian-born employees of the company were persecuted in Belarus for participating in 2020 Belarusian protests.

History 

In 2011, the company was founded by Mikita Mikado and Sergey Barysiuk in Minsk, Belarus. In 2014, company headquarters were moved to Silicon Valley. Mikado and Barysiuk initially created Quote Roller in 2011. In 2017, the company opened an office in St. Petersburg, Florida.

In 2015 company raised $5M in Series A, led by Altos Ventures. PandaDoc closed two Series B fundings, B1 in May 2017 with $15M, and B2 in August 2018 worth $30 million led by One Peak Partners. In September 2021, PandaDoc closed a Series C with a $1 billion valuation, thus becoming the first Belarus-originated unicorn.

Software 

PandaDoc proposal and contract software is a SaaS product for sales processes.

Features 

PandaDoc includes features  to create, track and execute documents, as well as functionality for electronic signatures. It consists of features in the following categories: proposals, quotes, team management, content management, branding, tracking, workflow, productivity, etc. It integrates with several CRMs, as well as ERP, payment, cloud storage, and other systems.

Political activity 

During 2020–21 Belarusian protests that followed rigged elections earlier, PandaDoc founders have offered a financial, aid and professional retraining (in the tech industry) to the police officers who have lost their jobs because of refusing to illegally suppress protesters. In retaliation, on September 2, 2020, the Minsk office was raided by the authorities, more than a hundred employees were questioned, 7 were detained. A criminal case was opened against four of them. Three of the arrested were conditionally released later that autumn; the last remaining person under arrest, product manager Victor Kunshinov, was released only in August 2021. He spent more than 1 year in prison. On 31 August 2021, the authorities of Belarus announced that the case against PandaDoc was closed after the defendants admitted their guilt and compensated the alleged damage.

In 2021-22, the company’s office in Minsk was liquidated, the staff was relocated to Portugal, Poland, the Philippines, and Kyiv.

Recognition and awards 

 2017 — Hot Vendor in Modern Content Management in 2017 by Aragon Research
2020 — Best Overall SaaS Award Winner by APPEALIE

See also 
 Sales quote

References

External links 

Software companies of the United States
Business software
Companies based in San Francisco
American companies established in 2013
2013 establishments in California